Events from the year 1796 in art.

Events
 Printing by lithography is invented by Alois Senefelder in Bohemia.

Works

 Henry Fuseli – The Night-Hag visiting the Lapland Witches
 Anton Graff – George Leopold Gogel 
 Antoine-Jean Gros – Bonaparte at the Pont d'Arcole
 Hugh Douglas Hamilton – Lord Edward Fitzgerald
 Thomas Lawrence – The Children of John Julius Angerstein
 Henry Raeburn – Rev. Alexander Carlyle
 Edward Savage – The Washington Family
 Gilbert Stuart – Lansdowne portrait of George Washington
 J. M. W. Turner – Fishermen at Sea (his first oil painting to be exhibited at the Royal Academy)
 Élisabeth Vigée Le Brun - Portrait of Countess Yekaterina von Engelhardt

Births
 February 3 – Jean-Baptiste Madou, Belgian painter and lithographer (died 1877)
 February 5 – Pieter Godfried Bertichen, Dutch painter and lithographer (died 1856)
 May 24 – Étienne-Jules Ramey, French sculptor and teacher (died 1852)
 May 28 – William Miller, Scottish Quaker line engraver (died 1882)
 June 27 (bapt.) – George Vincent, English landscape painter of the Norwich School (died c. 1832)
 June 30 – Antonin Moine, French romantic sculptor (died 1849)
 July 2 – Michael Thonet, German-born furniture designer (died 1871)
 July 3 – Maria Martin, American watercolor painter (died 1863)
 July 17 – Jean-Baptiste-Camille Corot, French painter (died 1875)
 July 26 – George Catlin, American painter specializing in portraits of Native Americans in the Old West (died 1872)
 August 21 – Asher Brown Durand, American painter of the Hudson River School (died 1886)
 August 30 – Julien-Léopold Boilly, French draughtsman and watercolorist (died 1874)
 September 4 – Peter Fendi, Austrian portrait and genre painter, engraver and lithographer (died 1842)
 September 5 – Jacobus Cornelis Gaal, Dutch painter and etcher (died 1866)
 September 24 – Antoine-Louis Barye, French sculptor (died 1875)
 October 9 – Joseph Bonomi the Younger, English sculptor, artist, Egyptologist and museum curator (died 1878)
 October 19 – Carl Wagner, German romantic landscape painter (died 1867)
 October 24 – David Roberts, Scottish painter (died 1864)
 October 30 – Wilhelm August Rieder, Austrian painter and draughtsman (died 1880)
 November 4 – John Neagle, American portrait painter (died 1865)
 date unknown
 Gilles-François Closson, Belgian landscape painter (died 1842)
 Joseph Farey, English mechanical engineer and draughtsman (died 1829)
 Giovanni Paolo Lasinio, Italian engraver (died 1855)
 Achille Etna Michallon, French landscape painter (died 1822)
 Marcin Zaleski, Polish painter (died 1877)
 probable – John Ternouth, English sculptor (died 1848)

Deaths
 March 9 – Saverio Gandini, Italian painter (born 1729)
 March 29 – Johan Philip Korn, Swedish painter (born 1728)
 April 2 – Ulrika Pasch, Swedish miniaturist painter (born 1735)
 August 6 – David Allan, Scottish painter of historical subjects (born 1744)
 August 8 – Franz Anton Maulbertsch, Austrian painter (born 1724)
 September 3 – Louis Jean-Jacques Durameau, French painter and winner of the Grand prix de Rome (born 1733)
 November 2 – Domenico Pozzi, Swiss painter (born 1745)
 November 12 – Margareta Christina Giers,  Swedish painter (born 1731)
 December 29 – Miguel Verdiguier, French sculptor (born 1706)
 date unknown
 John Frederick Miller, English illustrator (born 1759)
 Hugh Robinson, British history and portrait painter (born 1756)
 probable – Francesco Battaglioli, Italian painter of veduta and capriccios (born 1722)

References

 
Years of the 18th century in art
1790s in art